Doha College is a coeducational British international independent school located in Doha, Qatar. Doha College (or DC) was established in 1980 and was opened to meet the demands of a British-style education in the country. It has a student body of over 2,101 people from over 76 nationalities.

Doha College is an academically selective school, both for admissions and progress between key stages. The school is sponsored by the British Embassy and is a nor-for-profit organisation.

History
The school opened in April 1980 to meet the demand for a British curriculum in the country and is one of the oldest schools teaching the British curriculum in the region.

External links
 Doha College Website

Educational institutions established in 1980
Schools in Qatar
British international schools in Qatar
1980 establishments in Qatar
International schools in Qatar